Ibón de Plan or Basa de la Mora is a lake in the Province of Huesca, northeastern Spain. It is not connected to any specific river, since the water that fills it originates in the snow and the ice accumulated in such altitudes.

The name of Basa de la Mora (or "Basa la Mora", in Aragonese language) comes from a local folktale according to which a Moorish princess drowned in this lake trying to escape from the Christian troops. According to this legend, during Saint John's Eve the princess can be seen, dancing over the surface, by any person of pure heart that washes its face with the water of the lake.

References

Plan
Geography of the Province of Huesca